Alexandr Pavlovich Rasnitsyn (Russian: Александр Павлович Расницын) is a Russian entomologist, expert in palaeoentomology, and Honored Scientist of the Russian Federation (2001).
His scientific interests are centered on the palaeontology, phylogeny, and taxonomy of hymenopteran insects and insects in general.  He has also studied broader biological problems such as evolutionary theory, the principles of phylogenetics, taxonomy, nomenclature, and palaeoecology. He has published over 300 articles and books in several languages. In August 2008 he was awarded the Distinguished Research Medal of the International Society of Hymenopterists.

Biography 

Alexandr Rasnitsyn was born on 24 September 1936 in Moscow. As a schoolboy Alex was active in the Society of Young Biologists at the Moscow Zoo. In 1955 he became a student at the Biological Faculty of the Moscow State University and in 1960 he graduated with honors from the Department of Entomology. His Master thesis was "Hibernation in the ichneumon-fly subfamily Ichneumoninae". The same year Rasnitsyn joined the Laboratory of Arthropods at the Paleontological institute, Academy of Sciences of USSR. In 1967 he received his Ph.D. in biology from the Paleontological Institute with the thesis "The Mesozoic Hymenoptera Symphyta and the early evolution of Xyelidae". After defending in 1978 his Dr. hab. (doktor nauk) thesis "The origin and evolution of Hymenoptera" Rasnitsyn became Head of the Laboratory of Arthropods. In 1991 he received the title of a Biology Professor. In 1996 he resigned from heading the Laboratory and continued there as a principal research worker, but after the new leader, Vladimir Zherikhin, died in 2001 Rasnitsyn again became the acting Head of the Laboratory (2002—present).

Between 2001 and 2005 Rasnitsyn served as President of the International Palaeoentomological Society. Since 2007 he is serving on the Council of the Russian Entomological Society.

During more than 20 field seasons between 1956 and 2009 Rasnitsyn conducted field work in various regions of Russia and the former USSR, including Fergana Valley, Issyk Kul, Central Asia, Transbaikalia, Taimyr, Okhotsk, Sikhote-Alin, and other parts of Siberia, Far East, and Mongolia.

Family 
Rasnitsyn has one son, Dmitri, who is from a previous marriage. Dmitri married a Masha Kreinin and Rasnitsyn now has three grandchildren; Alexandra, Shelly, and Jonathan Rasnitsyn, who all live in the US.

Research 

One of the world's leading paleoentomologists, Rasnitsyn has described ca. 250 new genera and over 800 new species of fossil insects from various orders.

He is one of the foremost authorities on the paleontology and systematics of Hymenoptera whose ideas have formed the foundation of the modern classification of that insect order. Instead of the traditional division into Symphyta and Apocrita, he divided the order into “sawflies” (Siricina) and “stinging and parasitic wasps’’ (Vespina), the latter suborder including the parasitic Orussoidea, traditionally placed in the Symphyta.

Rasnitsyn suggested his own hypothesis on the origin of insect flight. According to him, the wings first evolved, as a means to control gliding, in relatively large insects that had turned to feeding on generative organs of arboreal plants.

Rasnitsyn is one of the most consistent opponents of cladism. He develops an alternative approach to biological systematics, called “phyletics”, which differs from phenetics in taking into account genealogy in addition to similarities and hiatuses.

He also contributed significantly to the epigenetic theory of evolution and, in particular, has put forward the concept of “adaptive compromise” and the notion of macroevolution being irreducible to microevolutionary processes alone.

Rasnitsyn has also made a significant contribution to paleoecology and in collaboration with Vladimir Zherikhin developed the theory of ecological crises.

New taxa described by Alexandr Rasnitsyn 

 Suborder †Eolepidopterigina Rasn., 1983 – a suborder of butterflies with the family Eolepidopterigidae Rasn., 1983
 Suborder †Aneuretopsychina Rasnitsyn et Kozlov, 1990 – a suborder of Mecoptera with the family Aneuretopsychidae Rasnitsyn et Kozlov, 1990
 Superfamily †Karatavitoidea Rasn., 1963 – a Mesozoic superfamily of the infraorder Orussomorpha Newman, 1834 with the family Karatavitidae Rasn., 1963
 Superfamily †Bethylonymoidea Rasn., 1975 – a Mesozoic superfamily of Hymenoptera Apocrita with the family Bethylonymidae Rasn., 1975. The ancestor group of Aculeata.
 Family †Parapamphiliidae Rasn., 1968 – later was included into Sepulcidae Rasn., 1968 as the subfamily Parapamphiliinae Rasn., 1968
 Family †Xyelydidae Rasn., 1968 – a Mesozoic family of Hymenoptera Symphyta from the superfamily Pamphilioidea
 Family †Gigasiricidae Rasn., 1968 – a Jurassic family of Hymenoptera Symphyta from the superfamily Siricoidea
 Family †Xyelotomidae Rasn., 1968 – a Mesozoic family of Hymenoptera Symphyta from the superfamily Tenthredinoidea
 Family †Pararchexyelydae Rasn., 1968 – a Mesozoic family of Hymenoptera Symphyta
 Family †Praeaulacidae Rasn., 1972 – a Mesozoic family of Hymenoptera Apocrita from the superfamily Evanioidea
 Family †Maimetshidae Rasn., 1975 – a Cretaceous family of Hymenoptera Apocrita from the superfamily Ceraphronoidea
 Family †Cretevaniidae Rasn., 1975 – a Mesozoic family of Hymenoptera Apocrita from the superfamily Evanioidea
 Family †Kotujellidae Rasn., 1975 – a Mesozoic family of Hymenoptera Apocrita from the superfamily Evanioidea (later included into Gasteruptiidae Ashmead, 1900)
 Family †Anomopterellidae Rasn., 1975 – a Mesozoic family of Hymenoptera Apocrita from the superfamily Evanioidea
 Family †Baissidae Rasn., 1975 – a Mesozoic family of Hymenoptera Apocrita from the superfamily Evanioidea (later was included into Aulacidae Schuckard, 1841)
 Family †Ichneumonomimidae Rasn., 1975 – a Mesozoic family of Hymenoptera Apocrita. Systematic position uncertain, probably a relative of Ichneumonoidea
 Family †Angarosphecidae Rasn., 1975 – a Mesozoic family of Hymenoptera Apocrita from the superfamily Scolioidea
 Family †Falsiformicidae Rasn., 1975 – a Cretaceous family of Hymenoptera Apocrita from the superfamily Scolioidea
 Family †Baissodidae Rasn., 1975 – a Mesozoic family of Hymenoptera Apocrita
 Family †Evenkiidae Rasn., 1977 – a Carboniferous family of the  order Protortoptera
 Family †Permonkidae Rasn., 1977 – a family of Miomoptera
 Family †Palaeomantiscidae Rasn., 1977 – a family of Miomoptera
 Family †Karataidae Rasn., 1977 – a Mesozoic family of Hymenoptera Apocrita
 Family †Electrotomidae Rasn., 1977 – a family of Tenthredinoidea from Baltic amber
 Family †Praeichneumonidae Rasn., 1983 – a Lower Cretaceous family of the superfamily Ichneumonoidea
 Family †Strashilidae Rasnitsyn, 1992 – a family of Mecopteroidea. Hypothetical ancestors of  Anoplura
 Family †Saurodectidae Rasnitsyn et Zherikhin, 2000 – a Mesozoic family of Mallophaga
 Family †Andreneliidae Rasnitsyn et Martinez-Delclos, 2000 – a family of Hymenoptera Apocrita of the superfamily Evanioidea
 Family †Tshekarcephalidae Novokshonov et Rasnitsyn, 2000 – a Paleozoic family of uncertain systematic position
 Family †Daohugoidae Rasn. et Zhang Haichun, 2004 – a family of Hymenoptera Symphyta of the superfamily Siricoidea
 Family †Khutelchalcididae Rasnitsyn, Basibuyuk et Quicke, 2004 – a family of Chalcidoidea
 Family †Radiophronidae Ortega-Blanco, Rasnitsyn et Delclos, 2010 – a Mesozoic family of Ceraphronoidea
 Subfamily †Archexyelinae Rsan., 1964 – a subfamily of Xyelidae Newman, 1834
 Subfamily †Dolichostigmatinae Rasn., 1968 – a subfamily of Anaxyelidae Martynov., 1925
 Subfamily †Karatavitinae Rasn., 1968 –a subfamily of Karatavitidae Rasn., 1963
 Subfamily †Sepulcinae Rasn., 1968 – was described as a subfamily of Karatavitidae Rasn., 1963, later was raised to the family rank, Sepulcidae Rasn., 1968
 Subfamily †Auliscinae Rasn., 1968 – a subfamily of Karatavitidae Rasn., 1963
 Subfamily †Praesiricinae Rasn., 1968 – was described as a subfamily of Karatavitidae Rasn., 1963, later was raised to the family rank, Praesiricidae Rasn. 1968
 Subfamily †Madygellinae Rasn., 1969 – a subfamily of Xyelidae Newman, 1834
 Subfamily †Cleistogastrinae Rasn., 1975 – a subfamily of Megalyridae Schletterer, 1889
 Subfamily Proscoliinae Rasn., 1977 – a recent subfamily of Scoliidae
 Subfamily †Juralydinae Rasn., 1977 – a subfamily ofPamphiliidae Cameron, 1890
 Subfamily †Mesorussinae Rasn., 1977 – a subfamily of Orussidae Mewman, 1834
 Subfamily †Cretogonalinae Rasn., 1977 – a subfamily of Trigonalidae Cresson, 1867
 Subfamily †Manlayinae Rasn., 1986 – a subfamily of Aulacidae Schuckard, 1841
 Subfamily †Ghilarellinae Rasn., 1986 – a subfamily of Sepulcidae Rasn., 1968
 Subfamily †Trematothoracinae Rasn., 1986 – a subfamily of Sepulcidae Rasn., 1968
 Subfamily †Priorvespinae Carpenter et Rasnitsyn, 1990 – a subfamily of Vespidae Latrielle, 1802
 Subfamily †Archaeoscoliinae Rasnitsyn, 1993 – a subfamily of Scoliidae
 Subfamily †Karataoserphinae Rasnitsyn, 1994 – a subfamily of Mesoserphidae Kozlov, 1970
 Subfamily †Iscopininae Rasnitsyn, 1980 – a subfamily of Pelecinidae Haliday, 1840.
 Tribe †Angaridyelini Rasn., 1966 – a tribe of the subfamily Macroxyelinae Ashmead, 1898 of the family Xyelidae
 Tribe †Cretodinapsini Rasn., 1977 – a tribe of the subfamily Megalyrinae of the family Megalyridae
 Tribe †Gigantoxyelini Rasn., 1969 – a tribe of the subfamily Macroxyelinae Ashmead, 1898 of the family Xyelidae Newmann, 1834

A.P. Rasnitsyn has also described ca. 250 new genera and over 800 new species of arthropods, mainly fossil.

Animal names in honor of Alexandr Rasnitsyn 
Over 50 species of animals have been named in honor of Rasnitsyn, as well as some taxa of higher rank:

 Rasnicynipidae Kovalev, 1996 (a replacement name for Rasnitsyniidae Kovalev, 1994)— a fossil family of Cynipoidea with the genus Rasnicynips Kovalev, 1996 (a replacement name for Rasnitsynia Kovalev 1994)
 Alexarasniidae Gorochov, 2011 — a fossil family of Polyneoptera with the genus Alexarasnia Gorochov, 2011
 Alexrasnitsyniidae Prokop & Nel, 2011 — a family of the Paleozoic order Diaphanopterodea with the genus Alexrasnitsynia Prokop & Nel, 2011
 Plumalexiidae Brothers, 2011 — a fossil family of Hymenoptera with the species Plumalexius rasnitsyni Brothers, 2011
 Rasnitsynaphididae Homan & Wegierek, 2011 — a fossil family of Aphidoidea with the species Rasnitsynaphis Homan & Wegierek, 2011
 Rasnitsynitini Kasparyan, 1994 — a tribe of the fossil subfamily Townesitinae of the family Ichneumonidae with the genus Rasnitsynites Kasparyan, 1994
 Rasnitsynella Krivolutzkii, 1976 — a fossil genus of Acarina
 Rasnitsynia Pagliano et Scaramozzino 1989 (a replacement name for Oligoneuroides Zhang 1985) — a fossil genus of Braconidae
 Rasnitsynitilla Lelej, 2006 — a genus of Mutillidae
 Alicodoxa rasnitsyni Emeljanov et Shcherbakov, 2011 — fossil genus and species of Fulgoroidea of the family Dictyopharidae
 Palerasnitsynus Wichard, Ross et Ross, 2011 — a fossil genus of Trichoptera of the family Psychomyiidae
 Rasnitsynala Zessin, Brauckmann et Groening, 2011 — a genus of Odonata from the family Erasipteridae

Publications 
A.P.  Rasnitsyn is an author of more than 300 books and articles, including 17 monographs.

Major works
 Rasnitsyn AP (1969) Origin and evolution of lower Hymenoptera. Trudy Paleontologicheskogo Instituta Akademii Nauk SSSR 123: 1–196 [In Russian, with English translation by Amerind Co., New Delhi, 1979].
 Rasnitsyn AP (1975) Hymenoptera Apocrita of the Mesozoic. Trudy Paleontologicheskogo Instituta Akademii Nauk SSSR 147: 1–134 [In Russian].
 Rasnitsyn AP (1980) Origin and evolution of Hymenoptera. Trudy Paleontologicheskogo Instituta Akademii Nauk SSSR 174: 1–192 [In Russian].
 Rohdendorf BB, Rasnitsyn AP, editors (1980) Historical development of the class Insecta. Trudy Paleontologicheskogo Instituta Akademii Nauk SSSR 175: 1–269, +8 pls. [In Russian].
 Rasnitsyn AP, Quicke DLJ, editors (2002) History of Insects. Kluwer Academic Publishers, Dordrecht, xii+517 pp. .
 Rasnitsyn AP (2005) Selected Works on Evolutionary Biology. KMK Scientific Press, Moscow, Russia, iv+347 pp [In Russian] [Collection of earlier papers, except for: “Dynamics of taxonomic diversity: An afterword of 2004”, pp. 247–248]. 
 Zherikhin VV, Ponomarenko AG, Rasnitsyn AP (2008) Introduction to Palaeoentomology. KMK Scientific Press, Moscow, 371 pp. [In Russian].

References

External links

Personal web page
Palaeoentomology in Russia
International Palaeoentomological Society

Living people
Russian paleontologists
Russian entomologists
Hymenopterists
1936 births
Soviet paleontologists
Soviet entomologists